Quercus potosina is a species of oak. It is native to northern Mexico, from Chihuahua, Durango, and Jalisco east as far as San Luis Potosí. It is placed in Quercus section Quercus.

Description

References

External links
photo of herbarium specimen at Missouri Botanical Garden, collected in San Luis Potosí in 1878

potosina
Endemic oaks of Mexico
Plants described in 1924
Flora of the Mexican Plateau
Taxa named by William Trelease